is a railway station on the Chūō Main Line, East Japan Railway Company (JR East) in Sasago-Kuronoda, in the city of Ōtsuki, Yamanashi Prefecture, Japan.

Lines
Sasago Station is served by the Chūō Main Line and is 100.4 kilometers from the terminus of the line at Tokyo Station.

Station layout
The station has a single island platform connected to the station building by an underpass. The station is unattended.

Platforms

History 
Sasago Station was opened on February 1, 1903 as station on the Japanese Government Railways (JGR) Chūō Main Line.  The JGR became the JNR (Japanese National Railways) after the end of World War II. The station has been unattended since March 1985. With the dissolution and privatization of the JNR on April 1, 1987, the station came under the control of the East Japan Railway Company. Automated turnstiles using the Suica IC Card system came into operation from October 16, 2004.

Passenger statistics
In fiscal 2010, the station was used by an average of 142 passengers daily (boarding passengers only).

Surrounding area
former Sasago village hall

See also
 List of railway stations in Japan

References

 Miyoshi Kozo. Chuo-sen Machi to eki Hyaku-niju nen. JT Publishing (2009)

External links

JR East Sasago Station

Railway stations in Yamanashi Prefecture
Railway stations in Japan opened in 1903
Chūō Main Line
Stations of East Japan Railway Company
Ōtsuki, Yamanashi